Alfred Harper (19 December 1914 – 1983) was a male boxer who competed for England.

Boxing career
Harper won the 1937 Amateur Boxing Association British featherweight title, when boxing out of the Aston ABC. The following year Harper represented England in the 57 kg division at the 1938 British Empire Games in Sydney, New South Wales, Australia.

Harper was also selected to compete in the featherweight tournament at the 1936 Summer Olympics, but he did not start the event.

Personal life
He was a mechanic by trade and lived in Ingleby Street, Spring Hill, Birmingham during 1938.

References

External links
 

1914 births
1983 deaths
English male boxers
Boxers at the 1938 British Empire Games
Commonwealth Games competitors for England